WSTL (1220 AM, "La Mega 94.9") is a radio station licensed to serve Providence, Rhode Island.  The station broadcasts a Spanish Tropical format programmed by Radio Sharon Foundation. Its programming is also heard on translator stations in Providence, W229AN (93.7 FM) and W235CN (94.9 FM).

Known as WRIB from 1947-July 7, 2006, the station changed callsigns to WSTL on July 7, 2006.

History

1940s

1947
The station was started as a 250-watt daytimer, WRIB with studios at the old Narragansett Hotel.

1950s

1952
WRIB increased its daytime power to the current 1 kilowatt.  It was still a daytime-only station at this point.

2000s

2006
For many years, WRIB had aired mostly brokered programming, serving as an outlet for primarily ethnic broadcasters. Faith Christian Center, an evangelical megachurch in nearby Seekonk, Massachusetts, bought WRIB in 2005. While the station's time brokers had expected to be forced to find new homes for their programming, Faith Christian took WRIB off the air at 12:30 on July 7, 2006, with no advance warning, angering many of WRIB's former time brokers. The church only gave the time brokers a few hours to get their equipment out of the studios or face charges for trespassing.  Some shows continue on other stations (e.g.: the Armenian Radio Hour is now on WARA) but others disappeared.

2010s

2017
On the morning of Friday, June 23, 2017, the station reported to be going off the air soon; they then went silent. On November 29, 2017 WSTL returned to the air with Spanish tropical, branded as "Mega 94.9" (simulcast on FM translator W235CN 94.9 FM Providence).

Translators

References

External links

Boston Radio essay on Providence radio (incomplete)
Armenian Radio Hour's take on the loss of WRIB
Providence Journal story from September 9, 2006 

Radio stations established in 1947
STL
1947 establishments in Rhode Island
STL